Aleksey Skurkovskiy is a Belarusian sprint canoer who competed in the early 2000s. He won a silver medal in the K-4 500 m event at the 2002 ICF Canoe Sprint World Championships in Seville.

References 

Belarusian male canoeists
Living people
Year of birth missing (living people)
ICF Canoe Sprint World Championships medalists in kayak